Kevin Devon Knox II (born August 11, 1999) is an American professional basketball player for the Portland Trail Blazers of the National Basketball Association (NBA). He played college basketball for the Kentucky Wildcats.

Knox was selected ninth overall by the New York Knicks in the 2018 NBA draft. In January 2022, he was traded to the Atlanta Hawks. Knox signed with the Detroit Pistons during the 2022 offseason, but he was dealt to the Trail Blazers in February 2023.

High school career
Knox attended Tampa Catholic High School in Tampa, Florida. As a junior, he averaged 30.1 points per game, 11.2 rebounds per game, and 2.4 assists while leading the Crusaders to regional and district championships and runner-up to the 2016 Florida Class 4A semifinals. In the 2016 summer, he joined his AAU team, E1T1 United on the Nike Elite Youth Basketball League (EYBL) Circuit. On May 14, 2016, Knox scored career high 28 points in a win against All Ohio Red. He averaged 19.6 points per game and 7.6 rebounds per game on the EYBL circuit. As a senior, Knox averaged 28.5 points per game and 11.3 rebounds per game leading Tampa Catholic to a (25–6) record. He played in the McDonald's All-American Game and Jordan Brand Classic.

Recruiting
He was a five-star recruit and was regarded as one of the top players in the 2017 class. On May 6, 2017, Knox committed to play basketball at the University of Kentucky, spurning offers from Duke, Florida State, Missouri and North Carolina. He also turned down a professional offer to play in the Chinese Basketball Association as well.

College career
In his freshman season, Knox led the Wildcats to a 10-8 conference record, finishing fourth in the SEC, and led the team with 15.9 points per game. He was named to the All-Rookie and First Team All-SEC teams. The team turned their fortunes around in time to win the SEC tournament, with Knox totaling 18 points and 7 rebounds in the final game against Tennessee. In the 2018 NCAA men's basketball tournament with Virginia losing to Maryland-Baltimore County, Cincinnati losing to Nevada, Tennessee losing to Loyola-Chicago, and Buffalo beating Arizona, Kentucky was considered to have an easier path to the Final Four but Kansas State beat them, with Kevin Knox posting 13 points and 8 rebounds.

On April 6, 2018, Knox declared for the 2018 NBA draft and hired an agent, forgoing his final three years of college eligibility.

Professional career

New York Knicks (2018–2022)
Knox was selected with the ninth overall pick by the New York Knicks in the 2018 NBA draft. On July 5, 2018, the Knicks announced that they had signed Knox. On October 17, he made his NBA debut, coming off the bench in a 126–107 win over the Atlanta Hawks with ten points, two steals and a block. Two days later, Knox scored team-high 17 points with six rebounds in a 107–105 loss to the Brooklyn Nets. One day later, he sprained his left ankle in a 103–101 loss to the Boston Celtics. Knox returned to action and on December 1, scoring a career-high 26 points with four rebounds, four assists, a steal and a block in a 136–134 overtime win over the Milwaukee Bucks. In January 2019, Knox received the Eastern Conference's NBA Rookie of the Month Award for games played in December 2018. On January 13, 2019, he scored a career-high 31 points with seven rebounds, and two steals in a 108–105 loss to the Philadelphia 76ers.

On December 21, 2019, Knox recorded a season-high 19 points, alongside four rebounds, two steals and three blocks, in a 123–102 loss to the Milwaukee Bucks. Knox's percentages dropped during his sophomore season, as he only played 17.9 minutes per game whilst averaging 6.4 points per game.

On December 21, 2020, the Knicks announced that they exercised their fourth-year option on Knox. On January 11, 2021, Knox scored a season-high 19 points, alongside five rebounds and two assists, in a 109–88 loss to the Charlotte Hornets. During the 2020–21 regular season, the Knicks finished with a 41–31 record and qualified for the playoffs for the first time since 2013. The Knicks faced the Atlanta Hawks during their first-round series. Knox made his playoff debut on May 30, 2021, scoring two points in a 113–96 Game 4 loss. The Knicks ended up losing the series in five games.

On December 12, 2021, Knox scored a season-high 18 points, alongside five rebounds, in a 112–97 loss to the Milwaukee Bucks.

Atlanta Hawks (2022)
On January 13, 2022, the Knicks traded Knox and a protected future first-round pick to the Atlanta Hawks in exchange for future teammate Cam Reddish, Solomon Hill, a 2025 second-round pick and cash considerations. Knox made his Hawks debut on January 19, scoring two points in a 134–122 win over the Minnesota Timberwolves. The Hawks qualified for the postseason and faced the Miami Heat during their first-round series. On April 17, Knox scored a playoff career-high 10 points, alongside two rebounds, in a 115–91 Game 1 loss. He surpassed this total on April 24, scoring 12 points in a 110–86 Game 4 loss. The Hawks ended up losing the series in five games.

Detroit Pistons (2022–2023)
On August 1, 2022, Knox signed with the Detroit Pistons. He made his Pistons debut on October 19, recording three points and three rebounds in a 113–109 win over the Orlando Magic. On November 23, Knox scored a season-high 21 points, alongside three rebounds and a career-high six 3-pointers, in a 125–116 win over the Utah Jazz.

Portland Trail Blazers (2023–present) 
On February 9, 2023, Knox was traded to the Portland Trail Blazers in a four-team trade involving the Atlanta Hawks and Golden State Warriors. He made his Trail Blazers debut on February 13, recording four points and two rebounds in a 127–115 win over the Los Angeles Lakers.

National team career
Knox won two gold medals with USA Basketball at the 2015 FIBA Americas Under-16 Championship and 2016 FIBA Under-17 World Championship.

Career statistics

NBA

Regular season

|-
| style="text-align:left;"|
| style="text-align:left;"|New York
| 75 || 57 || 28.8 || .370 || .343 || .717 || 4.5 || 1.1 || .6 || .3 || 12.8
|-
| style="text-align:left;"|
| style="text-align:left;"|New York
| 65 || 4 || 17.9 || .359 || .327 || .653 || 2.8 || .9 || .4 || .4 || 6.4
|-
| style="text-align:left;"|
| style="text-align:left;"|New York
| 42 || 0 || 11.0 || .392 || .393 || .800 || 1.5 || .5 || .3 || .1 || 3.9
|-
| style="text-align:left;"|
| style="text-align:left;"|New York
| 13 || 0 || 8.5 || .375 || .357 || .700 || 1.7 || .2 || .2 || .1 || 3.6
|-
| style="text-align:left;"|
| style="text-align:left;"|Atlanta
| 17 || 0 || 6.5 || .356 || .192 || .750 || 1.3 || .4 || .1 || .1 || 2.7
|-
| style="text-align:left;"|
| style="text-align:left;"|Detroit
| 42 || 1 || 14.1 || .469 || .371 || .788 || 2.6 || .4 || .3 || .3 || 5.6
|- class="sortbottom"
| style="text-align:center;" colspan="2"|Career
| 254 || 62 || 18.1 || .379 || .344 || .711 || 2.9 || .7 || .4 || .3 || 7.4

Playoffs

|-
| style="text-align:left;"|2021
| style="text-align:left;"|New York
| 1 || 0 || 4.0 ||  ||  || 1.000 || 1.0 || 1.0 || .0 || 1.0 || 2.0
|-
| style="text-align:left;"|2022
| style="text-align:left;"|Atlanta
| 2 || 0 || 4.5 || .636 || .600 || 1.000 || 1.0 || .0 || 1.0 || .0 || 11.0
|- class="sortbottom"
| style="text-align:center;" colspan="2"|Career
| 3 || 0 || 4.3 || .636 || .600 || 1.000 || 1.0 || .3 || .7 || .3 || 8.0

College

|-
| style="text-align:left;"|2017–18
| style="text-align:left;"|Kentucky
| 37 || 37 || 32.4 || .447 || .341 || .774 || 5.4 || 1.4 || .8 || .3 || 15.6

Personal life
Knox II is the son of former NFL receiver Kevin Knox. His younger brother, Kobe, plays college basketball for Grand Canyon in his freshman season. On September 4, 2018, Puma signed Knox to a multi-year endorsement deal.

References

External links

 Kentucky Wildcats bio
 USA Basketball bio

1999 births
Living people
21st-century African-American sportspeople
African-American basketball players
American men's basketball players
Atlanta Hawks players
Basketball players from Tampa, Florida
Detroit Pistons players
Kentucky Wildcats men's basketball players
McDonald's High School All-Americans
New York Knicks draft picks
New York Knicks players
Portland Trail Blazers players
Power forwards (basketball)
Small forwards